When We Are Married is a comedy by the English dramatist J. B. Priestley. Written in 1934, it was first performed in  London at the St. Martin's Theatre, London, on 11 October 1938. It transferred to the larger Prince's Theatre in March 1939 and ran until 24 June of that year.

Plot
A group of three couples, old friends and all married on the same day in the same chapel, gathers at the Helliwells’ home to celebrate their silver anniversary. When they discover that they are not legally married, each couple initially reacts with proper Victorian horror – what will the neighbours think? –  and all three couples find themselves reevaluating their marriages; hovering closely over the proceedings is the Yorkshire Argus alcohol-soaked photographer, keen to record the evening's events for posterity, and a wickedly destructive housekeeper who is hoping to use the couples' mortification to her own advantage. In the end, of course, everything turns out well, and the play ends on a happy note.

Original cast
Ruby Birtle  – Patricia Hayes
Gerald Forbes – Richard Warner
Mrs Northrop – Beatrice Varley
Nancy Holmes – Betty Fleetwood
Fred Dyson – Alexander Grandison
Henry Ormonroyd – Frank Pettingell
Alderman Joseph Helliwell – Lloyd Pearson
Maria Helliwell – Muriel George
Councillor Albert Parker – Raymond Huntley
Herbert Soppitt – Ernest Butcher
Clara Soppitt – Ethel Coleridge
Annie Parker – Helena Pickard
Lottie Grady – Mai Bacon
The Rev. Clement Mercer – Norman Wooland
Mayor of Clecklewyke – H. Marsh Dunn

Revivals
 25 December 1939 Broadway premiere, Lyceum Theatre, New York City
 1979 National Theatre, London
 5 March 1985 West End Whitehall Theatre, London
 July - August 1996 Chichester Festival Theatre
 April 2009 West Yorkshire Playhouse, Leeds (Cast included Les Dennis, Paul Bown and Jodie McNee)
 July - August 2009 Guthrie Theater, Minneapolis, Minnesota
 27 October 2010 - 26 February 2011, Garrick Theatre, London (Cast included Sam Kelly, Maureen Lipman, Lynda Baron and Jodie McNee who previously appeared in the 2009 Leeds production.)
 7 May 2014 - Shaw Theater, Niagara-On-The-Lake, Ontario, Canada
 1 May 2017 - People's Theatre, Newcastle upon Tyne, United Kingdom
September 2017 - Rugby Theatre, Rugby, Warwickshire, United Kingdom

Television, film and radio
In November 1938, When We Are Married became the first play to be televised unedited from a theatre when the BBC relayed the complete performance between 8.30 and 10.50 pm on 16 November.

A film adaptation was released in 1943 by British National Films featuring the three male leads from the original stage production and 1938 TV adaptation in the same roles: Raymond Huntley as Albert Parker (playing the same role again later in a 1951 television adaptation), Lloyd Pearson as Joseph Helliwell and Ernest Butcher as Herbert Soppitt; the cast also included Sydney Howard as Henry Ormonroyd, Olga Lindo as Maria Helliwell, Marian Spencer as Annie Parker, Ethel Coleridge as Clara Soppitt, Barry Morse as Gerald Forbes, Marjorie Rhodes as Mrs. Northrup and Lydia Sherwood as Lottie Grady. A made-for-television version was also produced in 1957.

BBC's Play of the Month broadcast an adaptation on 29 December 1975 directed by David Giles with John Stratton as Joseph Helliwell, Beryl Reid as Maria Helliwell, Eric Porter as Albert Parker, Patricia Routledge as Annie Parker, Richard Pearson as Herbert Soppitt, Thora Hird as Clara Soppitt, Shirley Steedman as Ruby Birtle, Sheila Burrell as Mrs. Northrop, Ronnie Barker as Henry Ormonroyd and Sheila Reid as Lottie Grady.

In a German television production (ARD / WDR) from 1982 with the title Wenn wir verheiratet sind played Gert Haucke, Hans Korte, Klaus Herm, Gustl Halenke, Christiane Hörbiger and Elisabeth Wiedemann, directed by Hans-Peter Kaufmann.

Another BBC Television production (broadcast on 26 December 1987 on BBC2) featured Peter Vaughan as Joseph Helliwell, Patricia Routledge as Maria Helliwell, Timothy West as Albert Parker, Prunella Scales (West's real-life wife) as Annie Parker, Bernard Cribbins as Herbert Soppitt, Rosemary Leach as Clara Soppitt, Sue Devaney as Ruby Birtle, Liz Smith as Mrs. Northrop, Joss Ackland as Henry Ormonroyd and Patsy Rowlands as Lottie Grady.

An adaptation was broadcast on BBC Radio 4 in 1994 directed by Matthew Walters with Alan Bennett as Herbert Soppitt, Alun Armstrong as Albert Parker, Michael Jayston as Joseph Helliwell, Brenda Blethyn as Clara Soppitt, Nicola Pagett as Maria Helliwell, Gwen Taylor as Annie Parker, Polly James as Lottie, Peter Woodthorpe as Henry Ormondroyd and Elizabeth Spriggs as Mrs. Northrop. The production was subsequently re-broadcast on BBC Radio 7 in 2011 and later on BBC Radio 4 Extra in 2012.

References

Further reading

External links
 
 
 
 
When We Are Married synopsis & character descriptions from StageAgent.com

1938 plays
Broadway plays
Comedy plays
Laurence Olivier Award-winning plays
British plays adapted into films
Plays by J. B. Priestley
1975 television plays
West End plays